Ceryx puncta is a moth of the subfamily Arctiinae. It was described by Herbert Druce in 1898. It is found on New Guinea.

References

Ceryx (moth)
Moths described in 1898